The 2015 East Lindsey District Council election took place on 7 May 2015 to elect members of East Lindsey District Council in England. This was on the same day as other local elections. The Conservative Party won overall control of the council from NOC.

Results

|-
| 
| No Label
| align="right"| 0
| align="right"| N/A
| align="right"| N/A
| align="right"| N/A
| align="right"| 0.00
| align="right"| 1.53
| align="right"| 1,350
| align="right"| 
|-

Council composition
After the election, the composition of the council was:

IND - Independent 
Lab - Labour 
LI - Lincolnshire Independents 
LD - Liberal Democrats

Ward results
Source -

Alford

A total of 18 ballots were rejected.

Binbrook

A total of 19 ballots were rejected.

Burgh Le Marsh

A total of 23 ballots were rejected.

Chapel St Leonards

A total of 13 ballots were rejected.

Coningsby & Mareham

A total of 45 ballots were rejected.

Croft

A total of 39 ballots were rejected.

Friskney

A total of 35 ballots were rejected.

Fulstow

A total of 17 ballots were rejected.

Grimoldby

A total of 9 ballots were rejected.

Hagworthingham

A total of 63 ballots were rejected.

Halton Holegate

A total of 23 ballots were rejected.

Holton Le Clay & North Thoresby 

A total of 37 ballots were rejected.

Horncastle

A total of 20 ballots were rejected.

Ingoldmells 

A total of 7 ballots were rejected.

Legbourne

A total of 61 ballots were rejected.

Mabelthorpe 

A total of 9 ballots were rejected.

Marsh Chapel & Somercotes

 

A total of 6 ballots were rejected.

North Holme

A total of 26 ballots were rejected.

Priory & St James 

A total of 51 ballots were rejected.

Roughton

Scarbrough & Seacroft

A total of 31 ballots were rejected.

Sibsey & Stickney

A total of 128 ballots were rejected.

Spilsby

A total of 8 ballots were rejected.

St Clements

A total of 34 ballots were rejected.

St Margarets

A total of 19 ballots were rejected.

St Marys

A total of 7 ballots were rejected.

St Michaels

A total of 19 ballots were rejected.

Sutton on Sea

A total of 3 ballots were rejected.

Tetford & Donington

A total of 14 ballots were rejected.

Tetney

A total of 32 ballots were rejected.

Trinity

A total of 0 ballots were rejected.

Wainfleet

A total of 6 ballots were rejected.

Willoughby with Sloothby

A total of 13 ballots were rejected.

Winthorpe

 
 
 

A total of 38 ballots were rejected.

Withern and Theddlethorpe

Woodhall Spa

A total of 20 ballots were rejected.

Wragby

A total of 49 ballots were rejected.

References

2015 English local elections
May 2015 events in the United Kingdom
2015
2010s in Lincolnshire